Bank of Lebanon and the Gulf (LGB Bank SAL, Arabic: بنك لبنان والخليج) is one of the financial banks of Lebanon. it was established in 1963, and was then named (Bank of Credit Agricole). In 1980 the name was changed to (Lebanon and Gulf Bank), after the ownership of its shares was transferred to a new group of Lebanese businessmen.

The bank operates from the headquarter in Beirut Central District, has 18 branches in Lebanon, a branch in Cyprus since1986, another in Iraq, and a representative office in Dubai. Its current general manager is Samer Itani.

See also 

 List of Banks in Lebanon
 Banque du Liban
 Bank Audi
 Bank of Beirut and Arab Countries
 First National Bank
 Intercontinental Bank of Lebanon (IBL)
 Economy of Lebanon

External links 
www.lgbbank.com/

References 

Banks of Lebanon
1963 establishments in Lebanon